The Nokia 5730 XpressMusic is a smartphone announced on March 11, 2009. Its features include a full backlit slide-out  QWERTY keyboard, dedicated camera, volume, gaming and music keys as well as Wi-Fi ( 801.2b/g) connectivity and a basic accelerometer which autorotates the display (in landscape or portrait mode). It runs on the Nokia's Symbian OS v9.3 S60 mobile phone platform. It is also very similar to the Nokia E75 model, the only difference being that the 5730 is dedicated to play music.

The screen is a 2.4" TFT (measured diagonally ) with a 240 by 320 pixel QVGA resolution. A  3.5mm audio jack allows regular earphones to be used, and the phone is available in a pink, red, blue or silver trim. An Ovi web application is also pre-installed, which is Nokia's online services platform, featuring games, music, videos, phone apps, media sharing and social networking.

Like many phones in its price range, it includes a 3.15-megapixel camera (with Carl-Zeiss optics, LED flash and 30fps VGA recording) as well as satellite and network-guided A-GPS. The N-Gage gaming platform is also assimilated, allowing users to trial, purchase and play 3-D N-Gage games (which can be downloaded through the application). It is also fully 3.5G compatible, enabling up to 7.2 MB/s mobile internet usage (as well as voicemail, video calling and email). Uniquely, when connected to a PC or laptop, it can act as a wireless broadband modem through an available network.

The device can also produce, read, and to a limited extent, edit files (only in an editor's version) from  Microsoft Word, PowerPoint and Excel. PDF files can also be viewed via Adobe Reader LE 1.5.0, and RealPlayer is included for streaming videos (e.g. YouTube).

References

External links
 Official Nokia Europe page
 Nokia Forum page with full specifications 

5730
Mobile phones introduced in 2009
Slider phones